Sakisaka (written: 向坂 or 咲坂) is a Japanese surname. Notable people with the surname include:

, Japanese manga artist
, Japanese Marxian economist

Japanese-language surnames